This is a list of active space probes which have escaped Earth orbit. It includes lunar space probes, but does not include space probes orbiting at the Sun–Earth Lagrangian points (for these, see List of objects at Lagrangian points). A craft is deemed "active" if it is still able to transmit usable data to Earth (whether or not it can receive commands).

The craft are further grouped by mission status – "en route", "mission in progress" or "mission complete" – based on their primary mission.  For example, though Voyager 1 is still contactable is enroute to the Oort Cloud and has exited the Solar System, it is listed as "mission complete" because its primary task of studying Jupiter and Saturn has been accomplished. Once a probe has reached its first primary target, it is no longer listed as "en route" whether or not further travel is involved.

Missions in progress

Moon

ARTEMIS P1/P2
 Mission: studying the effect of the solar wind on the Moon. Originally launched as Earth satellites, they were later repurposed and moved to lunar orbit.
Launched: February 17, 2007
Destination: Moon (in lunar orbit)
Arrival: July 2011
Institution:  NASA
Lunar Reconnaissance Orbiter
Mission: Orbiter engaged in lunar mapping intended to identify safe landing sites, locate potential resources on the Moon, characterize the radiation environment, and demonstrate new technology.
Launched: 18 June 2009
Destination: Moon (in lunar orbit)
Arrival: 23 June 2009
Institution:  NASA
Queqiao
Mission: Halo orbiter serving as communications satellite for Chang'e 4 lunar far-side mission; conducting joint China-Netherlands low frequency astronomy experiment.
Launched: 21:28 UT on 20 May 2018
Destination: in halo orbit about Earth-Moon L2
Arrival: 14 June 2018
Institution:  CNSA
Lander, Rover: Chang'e 4
Mission: Lander engaging in low-frequency radio spectrometry experiment, neutron and dosimetry experiment, and biological experiment. Rover seeking to characterize lunar far-side environment (including possible lunar mantle material) using visible/near-infrared spectrometer, ground penetrating radar, cameras, and neutral particle analyzer.
Launched: 18:23 UT on 8 December 2018
Destination: Lunar far side
Arrival: 02:26 UT on 3 January 2019
Institution:  CNSA
Chandrayaan-2 
Mission: engaged in lunar topography and mineralogy, elemental abundance, the lunar exosphere, and signatures of hydroxyl and water.
Launched: 22 July 2019
Destination: Moon (in lunar orbit)
Arrival: 7 September 2019
Institution:  ISRO
CAPSTONE
Mission: Lunar orbiting CubeSat that will test and verify the calculated orbital stability planned for the Gateway space station.
Launched: 28 June 2022
Destination: Moon (in a Near-rectilinear halo orbit (NRHO))
Arrival: 14 November 2022
Institution:  NASA
Danuri (Korea Pathfinder Lunar Orbiter)
Mission: Lunar Orbiter by the Korea Aerospace Research Institute (KARI) of South Korea. The orbiter, its science payload and ground control infrastructure are technology demonstrators. The orbiter will also be tasked with surveying lunar resources such as water ice, uranium, helium-3, silicon, and aluminium, and produce a topographic map to help select future lunar landing sites.
Launched: 4 August 2022
Destination: Moon (in lunar orbit)
Arrival: 16 December 2022 (enroute) 
Institution: collaboration between KARI and  NASA
Lunar Polar Hydrogen Mapper
Mission: Lunar Orbiter to search for evidence of lunar water ice inside permanently shadowed craters using its neutron detector.
Launched: 16 November 2022
Destination: Moon (in lunar orbit)
Arrival: November 2022 (enroute)
Institution:  NASA
Lunar IceCube
Mission: Lunar Orbiter that will uses its infrared spectrometer to detect water and organic compounds in the lunar surface and exosphere.
Launched: 16 November 2022
Destination: Moon (in lunar orbit)
Arrival: November 2022 (enroute) 
Institution:  NASA
EQUULEUS
Mission: Halo orbiter to  image the Earth's plasmasphere, impact craters on the Moon's far side and L2 experiments.
Launched: 16 November 2022
Destination: in halo orbit about Earth-Moon L2
Arrival: November 2022 (enroute)
Institution:  JAXA
Lunar Flashlight
Mission: Lunar orbiting CubeSat that will explore, locate, and estimate size and composition of water ice deposits on the Moon for future exploitation by robots or humans.
Launched: 11 December 2022
Destination: Moon
Arrival: April 2023 (enroute)
Institution:  NASA

Mercury 
BepiColombo
 Mission: Spacecraft consists of the Mercury Transfer Module (MTM), Mercury Planetary Orbiter (MPO), and the Mercury Magnetospheric Orbiter (MMO or Mio).  MTM and MPO are built by ESA while the MMO is mostly built by JAXA. Once the MTM delivers the MPO and MMO to Mercury orbit, the two orbiters will have the following objectives: to study Mercury's form, interior structure, geology, composition, and craters; to study the origin, structure, and dynamics of its magnetic field; to characterize the composition and dynamics of Mercury's vestigial atmosphere; to test Einstein's theory of general relativity; to search for asteroids sunward of Earth; and to generally study the origin and evolution of a planet close to a parent star.
Launched: 01:45:28 UT on 19 October 2018
Destination: Mercury
Arrival: En route (anticipated to enter Mercury polar orbit on 5 December 2025)
Institution:  ESA  JAXA

Venus 
Akatsuki
 Mission: The first Japanese Venusian probe. Also known as Planet-C and Venus Climate Orbiter, Akatsuki failed to enter Venusian orbit in December 2010. It continued to function and entered Venus orbit in 2015.
Launched: 20 May 2010
Destination: Venus
Arrival: 7 December 2015
Institution:  JAXA
Subprobes: IKAROS and Shin'en

Mars

2001 Mars Odyssey
Mission: Mars Odyssey was designed to map the surface of Mars and also acts as a relay for the Curiosity rover. Its name is a tribute to the novel and film 2001: A Space Odyssey.
Launched: 7 April 2001
Destination: Mars
Arrival: 24 October 2001
Institution:  NASA
Mars Express
Mission: Mars orbiter designed to study the planet's atmosphere and geology, search for sub-surface water, and deploy the Beagle 2 lander. In 2017 the mission was extended until at least the end of 2020.
Launched: 2 June 2003
Destination: Mars
Arrival: 25 December 2003
Institution:  ESA
Lander: Beagle 2 (mission failed; contact lost at separation but found in 2015 on surface)

Mars Reconnaissance Orbiter
Mission:  the second NASA satellite orbiting Mars. It is specifically designed to analyze the landforms, stratigraphy, minerals, and ice of the red planet.
Launched: 12 August 2005
Destination: Mars
Arrival: 10 March 2006
Institution:  NASA
Lander: [[Curiosity rover|Curiosity rover]]
Mission: searching for evidence of organic material on Mars, monitoring methane levels in the atmosphere, and engaging in exploration of the landing site at Gale Crater.
Launched: 26 November 2011
Destination: Mars
Arrival: 6 August 2012
Institution:   NASAMAVEN — Mars Atmosphere and Volatile Evolution.
Mission: study the Martian upper atmosphere and its gradual loss to space
Launched: 18 November 2013
Destination: Mars
Arrival: September 2014
Institution:  NASATrace Gas Orbiter (ExoMars 2016)
Mission: study methane and other trace gases in the Martian atmosphere
Launched: 14 March 2016
Destination: Mars
Arrived: 19 October 2016 (Mars orbit insertion), 21 April 2018 (final orbit)
Institution:  ESA
Lander: Schiaparelli (crashed upon landing attempt)Emirates Mars MissionMission: study weather and atmosphere.
Launched: 19 July 2020
Destination: Mars
Arrival: 9 February 2021
Institution:  UAESATianwen-1 orbiterMission: find evidence for current and past life and produce Martian surface maps. Orbital studies of Martian surface morphology, soil, and atmosphere. 
Launched: 23 July 2020
Destination: Mars
Arrival: 10 February 2021
Institution:  CNSAZhurong roverMission: find evidence for current and past life and in-situ studies of Martian surface morphology, soil, and atmosphere.
Launched: 23 July 2020
Destination: Mars
Arrival: 10 February 2021
Landing: 14 May 2021
Deployment date: 22 May 2021
Institution:  CNSA
Lander: Perseverance roverMission: searching for evidence of organic material on Mars, and engaging in exploration of the landing site at Jezero crater.
Launched: 30 July 2020
Destination: Jezero crater, Mars
Arrival: 18 February 2021
Institution:  NASA
Rotorcraft: Ingenuity  helicopterMission: experimental scout for Perseverance rover. Completed 1st flight on Mars
Launched: 30 July 2020
Destination: Jezero crater, Mars
Arrival: 18 February 2021
Deployment date: 4 April 2021
Institution:  NASA

 Asteroids and comets Hayabusa2
Mission: asteroid study and sample-return
Launched: 3 December 2014
First Destination: 162173 Ryugu
Arrival:  27 June 2018
Left Ryugu: 12 November 2019
Second Destination: 
Institution:  JAXA
Lander probe: MASCOT and MINERVA-II
OSIRIS-REx
Mission: asteroid study and sample-return
Launched: 8 September 2016
Destination: 101955 Bennu
Arrival:  3 December 2018
Left Bennu: 10 May 2021
Destination: 99942 Apophis
Arrival:  April 2029
Institution:  NASA
Lucy
Mission: to flyby 8 Jupiter trojan and one main belt asteroid
Launched: 15 October 2021
Destination: 52246 Donaldjohanson
Arrival:  20 April 2025
Institution:  NASA

LICIACube
Mission: to flyby a binary 65803 Didymos asteroid system, 65803 Didymos and Dimorphos 
Launched: 24 November 2021
Destination:65803 Didymos and Dimorphos (flyby)
Arrival: 26 September 2022
Institution:  ASI

Heliocentric orbit

Parker Solar Probe
Mission: observation of solar wind, magnetic fields, and coronal energy flow.
Launched: 12 August 2018
Destination: low solar orbit, perihelion 6.9 million km
Arrival: 19 January 2019
Institution:  NASA
Solar Orbiter
 Mission: detailed measurements of the inner heliosphere and nascent solar wind, and close observations of the polar regions of the Sun.
 Launched: 10 February 2020
Destination: High inclination solar orbit
 Arrival: Operational orbit in 2023
Institution:  ESA
CubeSat for Solar Particles
 Mission: study particles and magnetic fields.
Destination: Solar Orbit
 Launched and Arrived: 16 November 2022
Institution:  NASA

Outer Solar System

Juno
Mission: studying Jupiter from polar orbit. Intended to de-orbit into the Jovian atmosphere after 2021.
Launched: 5 August 2011
Destination: Jupiter
Arrival: 4 July 2016
Institution:  NASA
New Horizons
Mission: the first spacecraft to study Pluto up close, and ultimately the Kuiper Belt. It was the fastest spacecraft when leaving Earth and will be the fifth probe to leave the Solar System.
Launched: 19 January 2006
Destination: Pluto and Charon
Arrival: 14 July 2015
Left Charon: 14 July 2015
Destination: 486958 Arrokoth
Arrival: 1 January 2019
Institution:  NASA
Voyager 1
Mission: investigating Jupiter and Saturn, and the moons of these planets.  Its continuing data feed offered the first direct measurements of the heliosheath and the heliopause. It is currently the farthest man-made object from Earth, as well as the first object to leave the heliosphere and cross into interstellar space. As of November 2017 it has a distance from the Sun of about 140 astronomical units (AU) (21 billion kilometers, or 0.002 light years), and it will not be overtaken by any other current craft. In August 2012, Voyager 1 became the first human-built spacecraft to enter interstellar space. Though declining, the onboard power source should keep some of the probe's instruments running until 2025.
Launched: 5 September 1977
Destination: Jupiter and Saturn
Arrival: January 1979
Institution:  NASA
Primary mission completion: November 1980
Current trajectory: entered interstellar space August 2012
Voyager 2
Mission: studying all four gas giants. This mission was one of NASA's most successful, yielding a wealth of new information. As of November 2017 it is some 116 AU from the Sun (17.34 billion kilometers), and it is hoped the probe will continue to operate until at least 2020. It has left the heliosphere and crossed into interstellar space in December 2018. As with Voyager 1, scientists are now using Voyager 2 to learn what the Solar System is like beyond the heliosphere.
Launched: 20 August 1977
Destination: Jupiter, Saturn, Uranus, Neptune
Arrival: 9 July 1979
Institution:  NASA
Primary mission completion: August 1989
Current trajectory: entered interstellar space December 2018

Retired Notable missions 
Pioneer 6
Mission: measurements of the solar wind, solar magnetic field and cosmic rays. Oldest functioning probe (if still operating). Contact was last attempted 8 December 2000 to celebrate its 35th anniversary, and the attempt was successful.
Launched: 16 December 1965
Destination: heliocentric orbit
Institution:  NASA
Mission completion: ?
Current trajectory: heliocentric orbit
Pioneer 7
Mission:  measurements of the solar wind, solar magnetic field and cosmic rays. Last contacted 31 March 1995; no attempt has been made since, and this probe may or may not be operational.
Launched: 17 August 1966
Destination: heliocentric orbit
Institution:  NASA
Mission completion: ?
Current trajectory: heliocentric orbit
Pioneer 8
Mission: measurements of the solar wind, solar magnetic field and cosmic rays. Last contacted on 22 August 1996; no attempt has been made since, and this probe may or may not be operational.
Launched: 8 November 1967
Destination: heliocentric orbit
Institution:  NASA
Mission completion: ?
Current trajectory: heliocentric orbit
ICE
Mission: studying the interaction between the solar wind and (1) the Earth's magnetosphere, (2) the tail of comet Giacobini-Zinner, (3) the tail of Halley's Comet. Contact with the probe was lost on 16 September 2014. It is unknown whether contact can be reestablished because the probe's exact orbit is uncertain.
Launched: 12 August 1978
Destination: halo orbit around Earth-Sun Lagrangian point 
Institution:  NASA
Mission completion: 1997
Current trajectory: heliocentric orbit
Giotto
Mission: flyby and observation of Halley's Comet and Comet Grigg-Skjellerup to capture scientific data and images of the nucleus. The multicolor camera was destroyed in the encounter with Halley, but the probe remained otherwise functional for the second encounter.
Launched: 2 July 1985
Destination: Comet Halley
Arrival: 14 March 1986
Institution:  ESA
Mission completion: 14 March 1986 (Halley), 10 July 1992 (Grigg-Skjellerup)
Current trajectory: heliocentric orbit
Genesis
Mission: solar wind sample return
Launched: 8 August 2001
Destination: halo orbit around Sun-Earth Lagrangian point 
Arrival: 16 November 2001
Institution:  NASA
Mission completion: sample capsule returned to Earth 8 September 2004; parachutes failed to open, some samples contaminated
Current trajectory (spacecraft bus): heliocentric orbit near Sun-Earth  point

Cassini–Huygens
Mission: Cassini orbiter studying Saturn and its moons after passing Venus and Jupiter; Huygens landing probe investigating Titan.  Cassini primarily investigated Saturn's rings, its magnetosphere, and the geologic composition of its satellites.
Launched: 15 October 1997
Destination: Saturn
Arrival: 1 July 2004 (Saturn), 14 January 2005 (Titan)
Crashed: 15 September 2017
Institution: collaboration between  NASA,  ESA and  ASI
Lander: InSight
Mission: to study the deep interior of Mars, with a seismometer and a heat-flow probe.
Launched: 5 May 2018
Destination: Elysium Planitia, Mars
Arrival: 29 November 2018
Mission completion: 15 December 2022
Institution:  NASA

See also 

 Lists of spacecraft

References 

Probes
Solar System, Active
Probes, Active
Spaceflight timelines
Solar System-related lists